Bonci is an Italian surname, it may refer to:

 Alessandro Bonci (1870–1940), Italian lyric tenor
 Antonello Bonci, Italian neurologist and neuropsychopharmacologist
 Fabio Bonci (born 1949), Italian footballer
 Virginia Bonci (born 1949), Romanian athlete

See also
 Teatro Alessandro Bonci, opera house in Cesena, Italy

Italian-language surnames